Lourens Wepener Hugo "Laurie" Ackermann (b 14 January 1934) is a former justice of the Constitutional Court of South Africa, where he served from 1994 to 2004.

Ackermann was born in Pretoria, South Africa and he matriculated from Pretoria Boys High School in 1950. He studied law at Stellenbosch and Oxford University, where he went in 1954 as a Cape Rhodes Scholar. Laurie served on the Lesotho Court of Appeal from 1988 to 1992 and as the Namibian Supreme Court's acting judge of appeal from 1991 to 1992. He is married to Denise and has three children.

Ackermann was appointed to the newly formed Constitutional Court in 1994 after his nomination by President Nelson Mandela.

He is an honorary fellow of Worcester College, Oxford, his old college.

External links 
 Justice LWH Ackermann — Profile

1934 births
Living people
Justices of the Supreme Court of Namibia
Judges of the Constitutional Court of South Africa
People from Pretoria
Afrikaner people
South African people of Dutch descent
Alumni of Worcester College, Oxford
Stellenbosch University alumni
South African Rhodes Scholars
South African judges on the courts of Lesotho
South African judges on the courts of Namibia